Triplophyllum is a genus of ferns in the family Tectariaceae, according to the Pteridophyte Phylogeny Group classification of 2016 (PPG I).

Taxonomy
The genus Triplophyllum was erected by Richard Eric Holttum in 1986. The type species is Triplophyllum protensum, transferred from Aspidium protensum.

A 2016 molecular phylogenetic showed Triplophyllum to be in a clade containing Tectaria, sister to Hypoderris.

Species
, the Checklist of Ferns and Lycophytes of the World recognized the following species:

Triplophyllum angustifolium Holttum
Triplophyllum attenuatum (Pic.Serm.) Pic.Serm.
Triplophyllum batesii Holttum
Triplophyllum boliviense J.Prado & R.C.Moran
Triplophyllum buchholzii (Kuhn) Holttum
Triplophyllum chocoense J.Prado & R.C.Moran
Triplophyllum crassifolium Holttum
Triplophyllum dicksonioides (Fée) Holttum
Triplophyllum dimidiatum (Mett. ex Kuhn) Holttum
Triplophyllum fraternum (Mett.) Holttum
Triplophyllum funestum (Kunze) Holttum
Triplophyllum gabonense Holttum
Triplophyllum glabrum J.Prado & R.C.Moran
Triplophyllum heudelotii Pic.Serm.
Triplophyllum hirsutum (Holttum) J.Prado & R.C.Moran
Triplophyllum jenseniae (C.Chr.) Holttum
Triplophyllum pentagonum (Bonap.) Holttum
Triplophyllum perpilosum (Holttum) J.Prado & R.C.Moran
Triplophyllum pilosissimum (J.Sm. ex T.Moore) Holttum
Triplophyllum principis Holttum
Triplophyllum protensum (Afzel. ex Sw.) Holttum
Triplophyllum subquinquefidum (P.Beauv.) Pic.Serm.
Triplophyllum securidiforme (Hook.) Holttum
Triplophyllum speciosum (Mett. ex Kuhn) Holttum
Triplophyllum troupinii (Pic.Serm.) Holttum
Triplophyllum varians (T.Moore) Holttum
Triplophyllum vogelii (Hook.) Holttum

References

Tectariaceae
Fern genera